Hyrtinadine A is a chemical compound which is found in a marine sponge.

Notes

Indole alkaloids
Pyrimidines
Phenols